Ronald Louis Cooper (born February 11, 1962) is an American football coach and former player. He is the head football coach at Long Island University (LIU), a position he has held since the 2022 season. Cooper served as the head football coach at Eastern Michigan University from 1993 to 1994, the University of Louisville from 1995 to 1997, and Alabama A&M University from 1998 to 2001. He was also the interim head football coach at Florida International University (FIU) for the final eight games of the 2016 season. Cooper worked one season in the National Football League, as the defensive backs coach for the Tampa Bay Buccaneers in 2012. A native of Huntsville, Alabama, Cooper played high school football at Lee High School and college football at Jacksonville State University.

Coaching career

Eastern Michigan
Cooper was the head football coach at Eastern Michigan University in Ypsilanti, Michigan, from 1993 to 1994. At Eastern Michigan, his teams produced a record of 9–13.

Louisville
From 1995 to 1997 Cooper was the head football coach at the University of Louisville, replacing Howard Schnellenberger. In his final season, the Cardinals posted a 1–10 record. The one win came against Illinois who finished the season with no wins (0–11). Cooper's overall record at Louisville was 13–20. On November 19, 1997, Louisville fired Cooper due to a steady decline in the team's performance.

Alabama A&M
Cooper's last head coaching position was at Alabama Agricultural and Mechanical University, from 1998 to 2001. His squad won a division championship in Southwest Athletic Conference (SWAC) during the 2000 season but lost the SWAC Championship Game to Grambling on December 12, 2000.

Other coaching duties
In 2002, Cooper was the secondaries coach at the University of Wisconsin–Madison, and in 2003 the defensive coordinator and safeties coach at Mississippi State. Other coaching stops have included the University of South Carolina and the University of Notre Dame. Cooper is an alumnus of Jacksonville State University.

LSU TIGERS
Ron Cooper, coached the LSU Tigers defensive backs for three seasons.

Cooper had been responsible for overseeing perhaps the nation’s top secondary in 2011 as the Tigers feature two national award winners in Morris Claiborne (Thorpe Award) and Tyrann Mathieu (Bednarik Award). Claiborne (SEC Coaches) and Mathieu (AP) each picked up SEC Defensive Player of the Year honors in 2011. It was the second straight year that LSU featured the Thorpe and Bednarik Award winners along with the SEC Defensive Player of the Year. Patrick Peterson claimed all three honors in 2010 before being taken with the fifth overall pick in the NFL Draft.

As a unit, LSU’s secondary accounted for 16 interceptions, nine fumble recoveries and 12 forced fumbles as the Tigers led the nation in turnover margin (+1.69) and ranked fifth in total interceptions with 18. LSU allowed just seven passing touchdowns all season, the fewest by a Tiger team since limiting opponents to only five in 1989.

In his first two years with the Tigers, Cooper’s expertise coaching the secondary was evident as LSU had one of the best defensive backfields in the country. LSU led the SEC and ranked 10th in the nation in pass defense allowing 169.8 yards per game.

Cooper’s first year at LSU saw Peterson earn second team All-America honors, while safety Chad Jones was picked in the third round of the NFL Draft.

Tampa Bay Buccaneers
Cooper was hired by the Buccaneers on February 22, 2012, to be the team's defensive backs coach.

Florida International
In 2015, Cooper became the defensive coordinator and associate head coach at Florida International University. Following Ron Turner's termination in September 2016, Cooper was named interim head coach.

Alabama
On March 1, 2021, it was reported that Cooper had taken a job as an analyst with the Crimson Tide.

Long Island
In January 2022, Cooper was hired as the new head coach of the Long Island Sharks.

Head coaching record

* Interim HC

References

External links
 LIU profile
 Louisville profile

1962 births
Living people
Alabama A&M Bulldogs football coaches
Alabama Crimson Tide football coaches
Appalachian State Mountaineers football coaches
Austin Peay Governors football coaches
East Carolina Pirates football coaches
Eastern Michigan Eagles football coaches
FIU Panthers football coaches
Jacksonville State Gamecocks football players
LIU Sharks football coaches
Louisville Cardinals football coaches
LSU Tigers football coaches
Minnesota Golden Gophers football coaches
Mississippi State Bulldogs football coaches
Murray State Racers football coaches
Notre Dame Fighting Irish football coaches
South Carolina Gamecocks football coaches
South Florida Bulls football coaches
Tampa Bay Buccaneers coaches
UNLV Rebels football coaches
Wisconsin Badgers football coaches
Appalachian State University alumni
Sportspeople from Huntsville, Alabama
Coaches of American football from Alabama
Players of American football from Alabama
African-American coaches of American football
African-American players of American football
20th-century African-American sportspeople
21st-century African-American sportspeople